Carlos Sorín (born 1944 in Buenos Aires, Argentina) is a film director, screenplay writer, cinematographer, and film producer.  He works mainly in the cinema of Argentina.

Filmography
 La Película del rey (1986) a.k.a. A King and His Movie
 Eversmile, New Jersey (1989) a.k.a. Eterna sonrisa de New Jersey
 Historias mínimas (2002) a.k.a. Minimal Stories and Intimate Stories
 El Perro (2004) a.k.a. Bombón: El Perro
 18-j (2004)
 El Camino de San Diego (2006) a.k.a. The Road to San Diego
 La Ventana (film) (2009) a.k.a. The Window
 The Cat Vanishes (2011)
 Gone Fishing (2012)

Television
 Manos libres - El caso del bebé de los Perales (2005) (Mini TV Series)
 Ensayo (2003) Canal 7 Argentina - Documentary: Casting for a TV series
 La era del ñandú (1987) Documental Apócrifo - Canal 13 Argentina

References

External links
 
 link Argentine Press Review
 Argentinean Director Carlos Sorín Brings the Heart of Patagonia to London

1944 births
Argentine cinematographers
Argentine film directors
Argentine screenwriters
Male screenwriters
Argentine male writers
Spanish-language film directors
Living people
People from Buenos Aires